Umbilical-urachal sinus  is a congenital disorder of the urinary bladder caused by failure of obliteration of proximal or distal part of the allantois, and the presentation of this anomaly is more common in children and rarer in adults.

It is thought have been first described by Cabriolus in 1550.

Complications
 Infection, with possible abscess formation.
 Concurrent occurrence of a tumour.

See also
 Urachus

References

Congenital disorders of urinary system